Dialium ovoideum is a tropical species of plant in the family Fabaceae. It is endemic to Sri Lanka. The Sinhala (Sri Lanka) name ගල් සියඹලා (gal siyambala) means "pebble tamarind" (ගල්: pebble-like/stone-like/hard). The Tamil name பட்டு புளியம் பழம் means "silky tamarind" which is named after the silky texture of the shell of the fruit. (பட்டு: velvet).

References

The Plant List
JSTOR.org
Ayurvedic plants

ovoideum
Flora of Sri Lanka